The Attorney General of New Hampshire is a constitutional officer of the U.S. state of New Hampshire who serves as head of the New Hampshire Department of Justice. , the state's attorney general is John Formella.

Qualifications and appointment
Under Part II, Article 46 of the New Hampshire Constitution, the Attorney General is appointed by the Governor with approval of the Council.  The Attorney General serves a term of four years, as required by RSA 21-M:3, which is two years longer than the term of the Governor.  The Attorney General and their Deputy must be "admitted to the practice of law in New Hampshire" and also "be qualified by reason of education and experience."

Powers and duties
New Hampshire Revised Statutes Annotated (RSA) Section 7:6 lists the Attorney General's "Powers and Duties as State's Attorney":
Shall act as attorney for the state in all criminal and civil cases in the supreme court in which the state is interested, and in the prosecution of persons accused of crimes punishable with death or imprisonment for life.
Shall have and exercise general supervision of the criminal cases pending before the state supreme and superior courts, and
With the aid of the county attorneys, the Attorney General shall enforce the criminal laws of the state
Shall have the power to collect uncollected debts owed to the state as set forth in RSA 7:15-a.

The Attorney General can choose when to relieve any officer or person of any duty prescribed by law relative to the enforcement of any criminal law.

County Attorneys
Part II, Article 71, of the state constitution, provides for County Attorneys (previously County Solicitors) to be elected by the inhabitants of the respective counties according to the state Election laws. However RSA 7:34 states, "the county attorney of each county shall be under the direction of the Attorney General, and, in the absence of the latter, he or she shall perform all the duties of the Attorney General's office for the county."  In Wyman v. Danais, 101 N.H. 487, (1958), the New Hampshire Supreme Court held:

Office of the Attorney General
The Attorney General is required by statute to nominate a Deputy and a Director of Administration. They also may nominate Assistant and Senior Assistant Attorneys General, as well as Criminal Justice and Consumer Protection Investigators; provided there is money appropriated in biennium budget for such positions.  Additionally, in the interest of the public welfare, the Attorney General is permitted to delegate the authority of the office to the Deputy and Assistant Attorneys General as they see fit.

Deputy Attorney General
The Attorney General is required to nominate a Deputy Attorney General for appointment by the governor, with the consent of the council.  The Deputy acts as Attorney General whenever the latter is absent or unable to act from any cause, or whenever there is a vacancy in the office, provided an Acting Attorney General has not been appointed.

Acting Attorney General
The Governor and Council are required by RSA 7:15 to appoint an Acting Attorney General if the Attorney General becomes incapacitated to perform his or her duties.  The Acting Attorney General serves only during such incapacity and is paid a "reasonable compensation for his [or her] services and expenses." The Deputy Attorney General serves as the Acting Attorney General until the Governor and Council appoint someone to be the Acting Attorney General.

Assistant Attorneys General
The Attorney General is permitted to appoint Assistant Attorneys General subject to the approval of the governor and council, as provided for in the budget.  Assistant Attorneys General each serve a term of 5 years and should a position be vacant prior to the expiration of the term, such a vacancy can be filled for the remainder of the term. An Assistant Attorney General may be removed only as provided by RSA 4:1.

Senior Assistant Attorneys General
The Attorney General can also designate Senior Assistant Attorneys General, who serve at the pleasure of the Attorney General. Senior assistant attorneys general may serve as bureau chiefs, or in any other position as the Attorney General sees fit.

Director of Administration
The Attorney General is also required to nominate, subject to confirmation by the governor and council, an unclassified Director of Administration for the Office of Attorney General, within the limits of the appropriation made for the appointment, who shall serve for a 5-year term. The director of administration may be removed only as provided by RSA 4:1.

Investigators
The Attorney General may nominate Criminal Justice Investigators and Consumer Protection Investigators, subject to confirmation by the Governor and Council. Criminal Justice Investigators and Consumer Protection Investigators serve a term of five years.  The investigators are given statewide law enforcement authority, and are considered a "peace officer" as defined in RSA 594:1, III, which authorizes them to make arrests in a criminal case.  Investigators are required to meet the certification requirements for a police officer pursuant to RSA 188-F:26.  Unless investigators fails to achieve certification or are decertified by the New Hampshire Police Standards and Training Council, investigators are only subject to removal as provided by RSA 4:1.

List of attorneys general

References

External links

 New Hampshire Attorney General articles at ABA Journal
 News and Commentary at FindLaw
 New Hampshire Revised Statutes at Law.Justia.com
 U.S. Supreme Court Opinions - "Cases with title containing: State of New Hampshire" at FindLaw
 New Hampshire Bar Association
 New Hampshire Attorney General Joseph Foster profile at National Association of Attorneys General
 Press releases at New Hampshire Attorney General

Attorney General